Macdonald, Meredith and Aberdeen Additional is a township in Algoma District, Ontario, Canada. Originally surveyed as separate geographical townships, Macdonald and Meredith were incorporated as a single, municipal township in 1892. The geographical township of Aberdeen Additional was added to Macdonald and Meredith township in 1899 to create the municipal township of Macdonald, Meredith and Aberdeen Additional.

The township encompasses the unincorporated communities of Echo Bay, Bar River and Sylvan Valley.

Communities
Bar River is a small hamlet straddling the boundary between the townships of Macdonald, Meredith and Aberdeen Additional and Laird.

Echo Bay is located on the shores of the eponymous Echo Bay and Lake George. The community is home to a big loonie, similar to the Big Nickel in Sudbury, around  eastward. Robert-Ralph Carmichael, one of the Canadian dollar coin's designers, lived near Echo Bay.

Demographics 

Population trend:
 Population in 2016: 1,609
 Population in 2011: 1,464
 Population in 2006: 1,550
 Population in 2001: 1,452
 Population in 1996: 1,521
 Population in 1991: 1,548

See also
List of townships in Ontario
Campbellford: Location for a Giant Toonie Monument, similar to the Big Loonie.

References

External links
 

Municipalities in Algoma District
Single-tier municipalities in Ontario
Township municipalities in Ontario